George-Konell-Preis was a literary prize of Hesse.

Winners 

 1998: Gudrun Pausewang
 2000: Stephan Kaluza
 2002: Katja Behrens
 2004: Ricarda Junge
 2006: Peter Kurzeck
 2008: Silke Scheuermann
 2010: Michael Schneider
 2012: Alissa Walser
 2014: Stephan Thome
 2016: Saskia Hennig von Lange
 2018: Eva Demski

External links
 

Literary awards of Hesse
Culture in Wiesbaden